"Follow You" is a song by DJ/producer Deniz Koyu featuring singer Wynter Gordon.

Music video
The music video was released on 14 September 2012.

It has received over 1 million views on YouTube.

Track listing
Digital download
"Follow You (Radio Edit)" – 3:17
"Follow You" – 6:16

References

External links
 Full lyrics of this song

2012 singles
German dance songs
2012 songs
Wynter Gordon songs
Kontor Records singles
Songs written by Wynter Gordon